Vijaya Vauhini Studios was one of the premier motion picture movie studios in Chennai, Tamil Nadu, India. It is the combination of Vijaya Productions and Vauhini Studios. B. Nagi Reddy (Bommireddy Nagi Reddy) was the founder of Vijaya Productions and Moola Narayana Swamy founded Vauhini Studios.

History 

Being once considered as the largest film studio in Asia, Vijaya Vauhini Studios resulted from the merger between Vauhini Studios and Vijaya Productions, in 1948 when Telugu  film producer Moola Narayana Swamy leased the studios which was under heavy liabilities to the Vijaya Productions run by B. Nagi Reddy (Bommireddy Nagi Reddy), Chakrapani who were one time partners of Moola Narayana Swamy in the 1930s.

Productions 
Some of these films such as Pathala Bhairavi (1951), Pelli Chesi Choodu (1952), Chandraharam (1954), and Maya Bazar (1957) were dubbed into Tamil at the same time, Missamma was remade as Missiamma (1955) with Gemini Ganesan playing NTR's role. Excepting Chandraharam and Uma Chandi Gowri Sankarula Katha (1968), every film made by Vijaya Productions was successful at the box office.

Filmography

Awards

References 

 The Hindu
 Stars – Chakrapani: 100 years

External links 
 IMDb Page

Film production companies based in Chennai
Film production companies of India
Indian film studios
Mass media companies established in 1948
Indian companies established in 1948